"Shooting Stars" is a song by New Zealand band Dragon, released in January 1978 as the second and final single to be released from Dragon's fourth studio album, Running Free (1977).

Composition
Songwriter Hewson said, "Everybody went out for lunch so I sat at the piano and came up with it. On the original demo tape Marc Hunter plays drums, Robert Taylor is on bass, and I sang  - dreadfully but with feeling."

Track listing
 Shooting Stars (Paul Hewson) - 3:30
 Some Strange Dream (Todd Hunter) - 3:15

Charts

Personnel
 Bass – Todd Hunter
 Guitar – Robert Taylor
 Keyboards – Paul Hewson
 Lead Vocals – Marc Hunter
 Percussion – Kerry Jacobson
 Vocals – Paul Hewson, Robert Taylor, Todd Hunter

References

External links
Dragon - Shooting Stars

Dragon (band) songs
1978 singles
1977 songs
Portrait Records singles
CBS Records singles
Song recordings produced by Peter Dawkins (musician)